Orth an der Donau is a town in the district of Gänserndorf in the Austrian state of Lower Austria.

Geography
It is located on the bank of the Danube River, about 15 miles east of Vienna and 17 miles west of Bratislava.

History
In 1170, Hartneid von Orthe purchased the village and estate surrounding it, founded a church, and erected a castle. It remained in the family for several successive generations, when the proprietor, about the close of the 17th century, sold out and moved to Moravia.

References 

Cities and towns in Gänserndorf District
Populated places on the Danube
Croatian communities in Austria